The general time- and transfer-constants (TTC) analysis is the generalized version of the Cochran-Grabel (CG) method, which itself is the generalized version of zero-value time-constants (ZVT), which in turn is the generalization of the open-circuit time constant method (OCT). While the other methods mentioned provide varying terms of only the denominator of an arbitrary transfer function, TTC can be used to determine every term both in the numerator and the denominator. Its denominator terms are the same as that of Cochran-Grabel method, when stated in terms of time-constants (when expressed in Rosenstark notation). however, the numerator terms are determined using a combination of transfer constants and time constants, where the time constants are the same as those in CG method. Transfer constants are low frequency ratios of the output variable to input variable under different open- and short-circuited active elements.

In general, a transfer function (which can characterize gain, admittance, impedance, trans-impedance, etc. based on the choice of the input and output variables) can be written as:

The denominator terms
The first denominator term  can be expressed as the sum of zero value time constants (ZVTs):

where  is the time constant associated with the reactive element  when all the other sources are zero valued (hence the superscript '0'). Setting a capacitor value to zero corresponds to an open circuit, while a zero-valued inductor is a short circuit. This is the essence of ZVT method, which reduces to OCT when only capacitors are involved. All independent sources are also zero valued during the time constant calculations (voltage sources short circuited and current source open circuited). In this case, if the element in question (element ) is a capacitor, the time constant is given by

and when element  is an inductor is it given by:

.
where in both cases, the resistance , is the resistance seen by elements  (denoted by subscript), when all the other elements are zero valued (denoted by the zero superscript).

The second order denominator term is equal to:

The second order time constant, is simply the time constant associated with the reactive element  (where subscript always denotes the index of element in question), when element  is infinite valued. In this notation the superscript always denotes the index of the element (or elements) being infinite valued, with superscript zero implying all elements are zero valued. Infinite valued capacitors are short-circuits, while infinite value inductor are open circuits.

In general, any denominator terms can be expressed as:

where  is the time constant of associated with element , when all the elements with an index in the superscript (i.e.) are infinite valued (shorted capacitors and opened inductors). Usually the higher order time constants involve simpler calculation, as there are more infinite valued elements involved during their calculations.

The numerator terms
Transfer constants are low frequency gains (or in general ratios of the output to input variables) under different combinations of reactive elements being zero and infinite valued. The zeroth order transfer constant  denotes the ratio of the output to input when all elements are zero-valued (hence the superscript of 0).

Using the time constants and transfer constants all terms of the numerator can be calculated. In particular:

which is the transfer constant when all elements are zero valued (e.g., dc gain).

The first order numerator term can be expressed as the sum of the products of first order transfer constants  and their associated zero value time constants,

where transfer constant, is the ratio of the output to input when element  is infinite valued and all others are zero valued. Similarly, the second order numerator term is given by

In general, the th numerator term is given by:

This allows for full calculation of any transfer function to any degree of accuracy by generating sufficient number of numerator and denominator terms using the above expressions.

References

Electronics